Gerry Mulligan Presents a Concert in Jazz is an album recorded by American jazz saxophonist and bandleader Gerry Mulligan featuring performances recorded in 1961 which were released on the Verve label.

Reception

Allmusic awarded the album 4½ stars stating: "Gerry Mulligan's third LP to feature his Concert Jazz Band is one of his best efforts, because the concert repertoire recorded during this pair of 1961 studio sessions was written specifically for his group".

Track listing
All compositions by Gerry Mulligan except as indicated
 "All About Rosie" (George Russell) - 9:38
 "Weep" (Gary McFarland) - 5:57
 "I Know, Don't Know How" - 5:18
 "Chuggin'" (McFarland) - 4:42
 "Summer's Over" - 4:29
 "Israel" (John Carisi) - 3:06

Personnel
Gerry Mulligan - baritone saxophone, piano - track 4
Don Ferrara, Doc Severinsen, Nick Travis - trumpet
Willie Dennis - trombone
Alan Raph - bass trombone
Bob Brookmeyer - valve trombone, arranger
Bob Donovan - alto saxophone, flute
Gene Quill - alto saxophone, clarinet
Jim Reider - tenor saxophone
Gene Allen - baritone saxophone, bass clarinet
Bill Crow - bass
Mel Lewis - drums
George Russell (track 1), Gary McFarland (tracks 2 & 4), Johnny Carisi (track 6) - arranger

References

Gerry Mulligan albums
1961 albums
Verve Records albums
Albums arranged by John Carisi
Albums arranged by Gary McFarland
Albums arranged by George Russell (composer)